The phrase "" (or "" or also "") is a Latin aphorism meaning "knowledge is power", commonly attributed to Sir Francis Bacon. The expression "" ('knowledge itself is power') occurs in Bacon's Meditationes Sacrae (1597). The exact phrase "" (knowledge is power) was written for the first time in the 1668 version of Leviathan by Thomas Hobbes, who was a secretary to Bacon as a young man.

The related phrase "" is often translated as "wisdom is power".

History

Origins and parallels

A proverb in practically the same wording is found in Hebrew, in the Biblical Book of Proverbs (24:5): . This was translated in the Latin Vulgata as "" and in the King James Version as "A wise man is strong, a man of knowledge increaseth strength".

Thomas Hobbes

The first known reference of the exact phrase appeared in the Latin edition of Leviathan (1668; the English version had been published in 1651). This passage from Part 1 ("De Homine"), Chapter X ("De Potentia, Dignitate et Honore") occurs in a list of various attributes of man which constitute power; in this list, "sciences" or "the sciences" are given a minor position:

In the English version this passage reads as thus:

   
On a later work, De Corpore (1655), also written in Latin, Hobbes expanded the same idea:

In Hobbes and the social contract tradition (1988), Jean Hampton indicates that this quote is 'after Bacon' and in a footnote, that 'Hobbes was Bacon's secretary as a young man and had philosophical discussions with him' (Aubrey 1898, 331).

Francis Bacon

The closest expression in Bacon's works is, perhaps, the expression "", found in his Meditationes Sacrae (1597), which is translated as "knowledge itself is power":

One of many differing English translations of this section includes the following:

Interpretation of the notion of power meant by Bacon must therefore take into account his distinction between the power of knowing and the power of working and acting, the opposite of what is assumed when the maxim is taken out of context.  Indeed, the quotation has become a cliche.

In another place, Bacon wrote,  "Human knowledge and human power meet in one; for where the cause is not known the effect cannot be produced. Nature to be commanded must be obeyed; and that which in contemplation is as the cause is in operation as the rule."

Ralph Waldo Emerson 
Ralph Waldo Emerson wrote in his essay Old Age, included in the collection Society and Solitude (1870):

Wissen ist Macht in Germany 
After the 1871 unification of Germany, "" (Knowledge is power, geographical knowledge is world power) was often used in German geography and the public discussion to support efforts for a German colonial empire after 1880. Julius Perthes e.g., used the motto for his publishing house. However, this installation of geographical research followed popular requests and was not imposed by the government. Especially Count Bismarck was not much interested in German colonial adventures; his envoy Gustav Nachtigal started with the first protective areas, but was more interested in ethnological aspects.

After World War I, German geography tried to contribute to efforts to regain a world power. Scholars like Karl Haushofer, a former general, and his son Albrecht Haushofer (both in close contact with Rudolf Hess) got worldwide attention with their concept of geopolitics. Associations of German geographers and school teachers welcomed the Machtergreifung and hoped to get further influence in the new regime.

The postwar geography was much more cautious; concepts of political geography and projection of power had not been widespread scholarly topics until 1989 in Germany.

Geographical knowledge is however still of importance in Germany. Germans tend to mock US politicians' and celebrities' comparable lack of interest in the topic. A Sponti (Außerparlamentarische Opposition) version of the slogan is "Wissen ist Macht, nichts wissen, macht auch nichts", a pun about the previous motto along the line "Knowledge is power, but being ignorant doesn't bother anyway". Joschka Fischer and Daniel Cohn-Bendit belong to those Spontis that nevertheless held powerful positions, in Fischer's case with no more formal education than a taxi driver's licence.

The German Bundeswehr Bataillon Elektronische Kampfführung 932, an electronic warfare unit based in Frankenberg (Eder), still uses the Latin version  as its motto.

See also
Information warfare
Intelligence (information gathering)
List of Latin phrases
Power-knowledge
Rationality and power

References

Bibliography 
 Thomas Hobbes, Opera philosophica, quae latine scripsit, omnia in unum corpus nunc primum collecta studio et labore Gulielmi Molesworth, Bart. (London: Bohn, 1839–45).
 Thomas Hobbes, The English Works of Thomas Hobbes of Malmesbury; Now First Collected and Edited by Sir William Molesworth, Bart. (London: Bohn, 1839–45). 11 vols. 
 Ralph Waldo Emerson, Society and Solitude. Twelve Chapters, Boston, The Riverside Press, 1892.

Further reading
 Haas, Ernst B. When Knowledge is Power: Three Models of Change in International Organizations. University of California, 1990. .
 Higdon, Lee. "Knowledge is power." University Business, September 2005.
 Higdon argues that because the U.S. economy is a knowledge economy the decline in enrollment of non-U.S. students in U.S. universities "has serious long-term implications for the United States."
 "Knowledge is power (But only if you know how to acquire it)." The Economist, May 8, 2003.
A report on corporate knowledge management.
 Peterson, Ryan. "Michel Foucault: Power/Knowledge." Colorado State University Resource Centre for Communications Studies.
An exploration of what Peterson terms Foucault's "new model of the relations of power and knowledge" that contradicts Bacon.
 Powers, Rod. "Knowledge is power in the military." U.S. Military: The Orderly Room.

External links
 
Scientiaestex

Aphorisms
Knowledge
Latin words and phrases
Quotations from science
Quotations from literature
16th-century neologisms
17th-century neologisms
Power (social and political) concepts
Francis Bacon